The men's 5000 metres event at the 2011 All-Africa Games was held on 15 September.

Results

References
Results
Results

5000